Wild Scotland is the Scottish Wildlife and Nature Tourism Operators Association - a not-for-profit organisation made up of wildlife and nature tourism professionals.

Formed in 2003 the association has more than 80 members which represents one quarter of Scotland's wildlife tourism businesses.

References 

Adventure travel
2003 establishments in Scotland